The highland yellow-shouldered bat (Sturnira ludovici)  is a species of bat in the family Phyllostomidae. It is found in Colombia, Costa Rica, Ecuador, El Salvador, Guatemala, Guyana, Honduras, Mexico, Nicaragua, Panama, and Venezuela.

References

Sturnira
Bats of Central America
Bats of South America
Bats of Mexico
Mammals of Colombia
Mammals of Ecuador
Mammals of Guyana
Mammals of Venezuela
Mammals described in 1924
Taxonomy articles created by Polbot